Mwinilunga is a constituency of the National Assembly of Zambia. It covers the towns of Chimwishi, Lumwana, Mushinshi and Mwinilunga in Mwinilunga District of North-Western Province. The original Mwinilunga constituency was formed for the 1964 Legislative Council elections. In 1973 it was split into Mwinilunga East and Mwinilunga West. Mwinilunga East was subsequently renamed Mwinilunga in 2011, with Mwinilunga West being renamed Ikeleng'i.

List of MPs

References

Constituencies of the National Assembly of Zambia
Constituencies established in 1964
1964 establishments in Zambia